Kongsvoll Station is a railway station located at Kongsvoll in the municipality of Oppdal in Trøndelag county, Norway.  It's located in the Drivdalen valley, along the Driva river and the European route E06 highway. 

The station is located along the Dovre Line and is served by four daily express trains to Oslo and Trondheim. The unmanned station is located in the mountains, outside of civilization, with no permanent population close by.  The station is used to access the mountain hiking and skiing areas around, as well as the Kongsvoll hotel.

History
The station was designed by Erik Glosimodt and opened in 1921 as part of the Dovre Line when it was extended from Dombås to Trondheim. The wooden station was preserved as a cultural heritage in 1997.

References

Railway stations in Trøndelag
Railway stations on the Dovre Line
Railway stations opened in 1921
1921 establishments in Norway
Oppdal